The Clash was an annual rugby union match hosted by Bath Rugby around Easter time each year. It is one of Bath's regular home matches in Premiership Rugby but it is moved from their usual home ground at the Recreation Ground in Bath (14,500 capacity) to the much larger Twickenham Stadium in London (82,000 seats).

There are other high-profile matches in London between Premiership Rugby clubs at other times, particularly the London Double Header and the Big Game (also at Twickenham) and Saracens' European or Premiership games at Wembley Stadium, London Stadium and Tottenham Hotspur Stadium.

The 2020 match against Wasps was rescheduled and moved to The Rec as a result of the COVID-19 pandemic.

Game History

2017

2018

2019

Notes

References 

Rugby union in the United Kingdom
Bath Rugby